Sam Pan Bok (Thai: สามพันโบก) is a seasonal attraction and also known as the "Grand Canyon of Thailand" and is the biggest rock reef in the Mekong River.  Sam Phan Bok is a group of sandstone that has been eroded by stream from the Mekong River every rainy season until this area has more than 3,000 Bok with countless basins and potholes.  It is located 700km from Bangkok. Sam Phan Bok translates as '3,000 shallow lakes'. Sam Pan Bok is in northeastern Thailand (Isan), on the bank of the Mekong. Administratively, it is in Baan Phong Pao, Lao Ngam Sub-district, Pho Sai District, Ubon Ratchathani Province.  The holes in the sandstone rocks had developed over millions of years. There are different sections of Sam Phan Bok including Hat Hong, Pak Bong and Lak Sila Lek.

References 

Tourist attractions in Ubon Ratchathani province
Geography of Ubon Ratchathani province

External links